Farakka Assembly constituency is an assembly constituency in Murshidabad district in the Indian state of West Bengal.

Overview
As per orders of the Delimitation Commission, No. 55 Farakka Assembly constituency covers Farakka community development block and Gajinagar Malancha and Kanchantala gram panchayats of Samserganj community development block.

Farakka Assembly constituency is part of No. 8 Maldaha Dakshin (Lok Sabha constituency). It was earlier part of Jangipur (Lok Sabha constituency).

Members of Legislative Assembly

Election result

2021

2016
In the 2016 elections, Mainul Haque of Indian National Congress defeated his nearest rival Md. Mustafa of Trinamool Congress.

2011
In the 2011 elections, Mainul Hague of Congress defeated his nearest rival Abdus Salam of CPI(M).

Sanu Seikh, contesting as an independent, was a Congress rebel.

.# Swing calculated on Congress+Trinamool Congress vote percentages taken together in 2006.

1977–2006
In the 2006, 2001 and 1996 state assembly elections, Mainul Haque of Congress won the Farakka assembly seat defeating his nearest rivals Abdus Salam, Mir Tarekul Islam and Abul Hasnat Khan, all of CPI(M), respectively. Contests in most years were multi cornered but only winners and runners are being mentioned. Abul Hasnat Khan of CPI(M) defeated Mainul Haque and Mainul Sheikh, both of Congress, in 1991 and 1987 respectively, and Jerat Ali, Independent, in 1982 and 1977.

1951–1972
Jerat Ali of CPI(M) won in 1972 and 1971. Shadat Hossain of Bangla Congress won in 1969. T.A.N.Nabi of Bangla Congress won in 1967. Mahammad Giasuddin of Congress won in 1962, 1957 and in independent India's first election in 1951.

References

Assembly constituencies of West Bengal
Politics of Murshidabad district